1197 AM (call sign: 4YB) is a community broadcast radio station operated by Brisbane Interactive Radio Group Inc., which is a community-based not-for-profit youth organisation based in Brisbane Queensland, Australia. The station also simulcasts its programming output on DAB+ Digital Radio.

History
Brisbane Interactive Radio Group Inc. (BIRGI) was founded in 1998 by Matthew Boyd, Tim Casey  Andrew Stephens, Steven Mcviegh, Jon Mustchin and Cass Myles, and was granted a series of temporary radio broadcasting licences, allowing shared transmissions with other aspirant broadcasters on 97.3 MHz. In 2001, the 97.3 MHz frequency was auctioned to the Australian Radio Network.

In 2002, the Australian Broadcasting Authority granted a high powered FM community licence to Christian broadcaster 96five Family FM on 96.5 MHz, and a high powered AM community licence to BIRGI on 1197 kHz. BIRGI commenced test transmissions in late 2002 and began full-time broadcasting at 8 am on 7 April 2003, identifying as i-1197. From this period of time until January 2005, the station broadcast an uninhibited range of music genres and programming, with a slight focus on Top 40 music.

In January 2005, the station was re-branded to the programming format based upon its predecessor, Switch FM, focusing on playing a more Rhythmic format, along with adopting the brand name of Switch 1197. In April 2013, the station celebrated its 10th consecutive broadcasting year on the AM band, by airing daily compiles of material collected both on and off-air over that decade-long period.

In 2017, the station re-branded as Brisbane Youth Radio, with a new callsign of 4YB. In 2019, the station was re-branded once again from Brisbane Youth Radio to 1197 AM.

Audio streaming
In 2004, the station was the first radio station in Australia to stream with aacPlus technology and it continues to provide both near CD quality (64kbit/s) and Mobile (32kbit/s) compatible streams, as well as a 128k MP3 stream.

In 2007, the station was added to the Internode Broadband Radio Streams that are provided by Australian ISP Internode.

Programming
The stations general weekday daytime programming contains a contemporary music mix, with announcers presenting entertaining and informative pieces. Various information segments are also aired, most with a specific focus (e.g. Local Events, Community Services and News among others).

The stations night-time and weekend programming focuses on more specialist program material including Local Music, Alternative, Rock, as well as specialist talk and information programming.

See also
 List of radio stations in Australia

References

External links
Official website
1197 AM on Facebook

Radio stations in Brisbane
Community radio stations in Australia
Radio stations established in 2003